Fond du Lac Area Transit is the city's local public transit operator. The first public transit in Fond du Lac was a privately owned streetcar service in the 1880s; which transitioned to buses between 1944 and 1967. After several private operators, the bus system ceased operations in December 1967. In August 1968 the Fondy Area Bus Cooperative was established to provide bus service by support of private citizens and businesses, in lieu of a municipal one; however, it asked the city for financial support in 1970.

The current city-owned transit system began operations on January 15, 1973, following the successful passing of the referendum on November 7, 1972. It operates eight bus routes (with one of those routes operating only in the morning and afternoon to service K-12 schools), as well as a Paratransit service and taxi service for areas that the bus system does not reach.

Ridership

See also
 List of bus transit systems in the United States
 List of intercity bus stops in Wisconsin
 GO Transit

References

External links
https://www.fdl.wi.gov/transit/

Fond du Lac, Wisconsin
Bus transportation in Wisconsin